The International Horn Society (IHS) is an international organization dedicated to players of the horn founded in June 1970 with a goal to promote horn playing, education and fellowship. A community of over 3500 members from 55 countries around the globe, the society aims to bring together horn players, educators, and enthusiasts from around the world to share knowledge and experience.

The society's activities include holding workshops, lectures, and seminars that are open to the public, publishing a journal and newsletters that feature materials related to the horn. The IHS also encourages composers and arrangers to write music featuring the horn, fosters competitions for new repertoire featuring the horn, and establishes and maintains an archives and research facility pertaining to the horn. The society also works closely with music teachers and presents honors and recognition for distinctive service relating to the horn.

It holds an annual symposium, and publishes a journal, The Horn Call.

References

Brass instrument organizations
Organizations established in 1970